The Music Ain't Loud Enuff is the debut album by DJ Kool, released in 1990. The album contains 18 tracks, including the title song, which was originally released by Creative Funk Records as a single in 1988.

Track listing

References

External links
"The Music Ain't Loud Enuff" at Discogs.com

1990 debut albums
DJ Kool albums